An All-American team is an honorary sports team composed of the best amateur players of a specific season for each team position—who in turn are given the honorific "All-America" and typically referred to as "All-American athletes", or simply "All-Americans".  Although the honorees generally do not compete together as a unit, the term is used in U.S. team sports to refer to players who are selected by members of the national media.  Walter Camp selected the first All-America team in the early days of American football in 1889.  The 2013 NCAA Men's Basketball All-Americans are honorary lists that include All-American selections from the Associated Press (AP), the United States Basketball Writers Association (USBWA), the Sporting News (TSN), and the National Association of Basketball Coaches (NABC) for the 2012–13 NCAA Division I men's basketball season.  All selectors choose at least a first and second 5-man team. The NABC, TSN and AP choose third teams, while AP also lists honorable mention selections.

The Consensus 2013 College Basketball All-American team is determined by aggregating the results of the four major All-American teams as determined by the National Collegiate Athletic Association (NCAA).  Since United Press International was replaced by TSN in 1997, the four major selectors have been the aforementioned ones.  AP has been a selector since 1948, NABC since 1957 and USBWA since 1960.  To earn "consensus" status, a player must win honors based on a point system computed from the four different all-America teams. The point system consists of three points for first team, two points for the second team and one point for third team. No honorable mention or fourth team or lower are used in the computation.  The top five totals plus ties are first team and the next five plus ties are second team.

Although the aforementioned lists are used to determine consensus honors, there are numerous other All-American lists.  The ten finalists for the John Wooden Award are described as Wooden All-Americans.  The ten finalists for the Senior CLASS Award are described as Senior All-Americans.  Other All-American lists include those determined by Fox Sports, and Yahoo! Sports.  The scholar-athletes selected by College Sports Information Directors of America (CoSIDA) are termed Academic All-Americans.

2013 Consensus All-America team
PG – Point guard
SG – Shooting guard
PF – Power forward
SF – Small forward
C – Center

Individual All-America teams

By team

AP Honorable Mention:

Kyle Barone, Idaho
Jerrelle Benimon, Towson
Anthony Bennett, UNLV
Tommy Brenton, Stony Brook
Sherwood Brown, Florida Gulf Coast
Isaiah Canaan, Murray State
Kentavious Caldwell-Pope, Georgia
Michael Carter-Williams, Syracuse
Ian Clark, Belmont
Jake Cohen, Davidson
Jack Cooley, Notre Dame
D. J. Cooper, Ohio
Allen Crabbe, California
Aaron Craft, Ohio State
Seth Curry, Duke
Matthew Dellavedova, Saint Mary's
Gorgui Dieng, Louisville
James Ennis, Long Beach State
Chris Flores, NJIT
Jamaal Franklin, San Diego State
Ian Hummer, Princeton
Colton Iverson, Colorado State
Joe Jackson, Memphis
Kareem Jamar, Montana
Lamont Jones, Iona
Ray McCallum, Jr., Detroit
Rodney McGruder, Kansas State
Shabazz Muhammad, UCLA
Erik Murphy, Florida
Mike Muscala, Bucknell
Stan Okoye, VMI
Jamal Olasewere, Long Island
Phil Pressey, Missouri
Augustine Rubit, South Alabama
Peyton Siva, Louisville
Taylor Smith, Stephen F. Austin
Omar Strong, Texas Southern
Kendall Williams, New Mexico
Pendarvis Williams, Norfolk State
Khalif Wyatt, Temple

Academic All-Americans
On February 21, 2013, CoSIDA and Capital One announced the 2013 Academic All-America team, with Aaron Craft headlining the University Division as the men's college basketball Academic All-American of the Year.  The following is the 2012–13 Capital One Academic All-America Men's Basketball Team (University Division) as selected by CoSIDA:

Senior All-Americans
The ten finalists for the Senior CLASS Award are called Senior All-Americans.  The 10 honorees are as follows: Jordan Hulls won the Senior CLASS Award.

Notes

All-Americans
NCAA Men's Basketball All-Americans